Geophagus sveni is a Geophagini cichlid native to the Tocantins River drainage in Brazil. The Geophagus sveni Lucinda is a medium-sized cichlid that reaches approximately 225 mm in standard length (SL), and is usually found in the Tocantins River basin. Similarly, the Geophagus sveni has a typical teleost encephalon, without significant intraspecific variation and hence without dimorphic traits.

References 

Cichlid fish of South America